The following is a list of notable deaths in May 2002.

Entries for each day are listed alphabetically by surname. A typical entry lists information in the following sequence:
 Name, age, country of citizenship at birth, subsequent country of citizenship (if applicable), reason for notability, cause of death (if known), and reference.

May 2002

1
Ebrahim Al-Arrayedh, 94, Bahraini writer and poet.
Ade Bethune, 88, American Catholic liturgical artist.
John Nathan-Turner, 54, British television producer (Doctor Who).
Victor Peirce, 43, Australian criminal, shot.
Kevin Quinn, 79, Irish cricket and rugby player.
Tom Sutton, 65, American comic book artist (Vampirella, Doctor Strange, Ghost Rider), heart attack.
Birger Tvedt, 92, Norwegian sports medical and physiotherapist.

2
Peter Thomas Bauer, 86, Hungarian-British economist, known as a Margaret Thatcher spokesman against development aid for the third world.
Olive Cook, 90, British writer and artist, cancer.
Alfred Gessow, 79, American helicopter and aerospace engineer.
Sihung Lung, 72, Taiwanese movie and TV actor, liver failure.
Edna Mae Robinson, 86, American dancer, actress, and activist.
Richard Stücklen, 85, German politician, President of the Bundestag.
Judy Toll, 44, American actress, writer and comedian, melanoma.
William Thomas Tutte, 84, Bletchley Park cryptographer and British, later Canadian, mathematician.

3
Martin Aronstein, 65, American theatrical lighting designer, five-time nominee for the Tony Award for Best Lighting Design.
Livingston L. Biddle Jr., 83, American author and promoter of funding for the arts (chairman of the National Endowment for the Arts).
Malcolm Bosse, 75, American author, known for his historical novels set in Asia.
Barbara Castle, Baroness Castle of Blackburn, 91, British Labour politician and female life peer.
Muhammad Haji Ibrahim Egal, 73, president of Somaliland and former prime minister of the Somali Republic.
Mohan Singh Oberoi, 103, Indian hotelier and retailer.
Mariana Yampolsky, 76, Mexican photographer.

4
Don Allard, 66, American football player (New York Titans, Boston Patriots) and coach.
Robert R. Bertrand, 96, American sound engineer.
Clarence Boston, 85, American college football coach, head coach of New Hampshire Wildcats from 1949 to 1964.
John Hasted, 81, British physicist and folk musician.
Elizabeth Russell, 85, American actress.
Abu Turab al-Zahiri, 79, Saudi Arabian writer of Arab Indian descent.

5
Hugo Banzer, 75, Bolivian politician, Bolivian dictator (1971 to 1978), President of Bolivia (1997 to 2001).
Howard C. Bratton, 80, American judge (U.S. District Judge of the U.S. District Court for the District of New Mexico).
Dick Farman, 85, American professional football player (Washington State, Washington Redskins).
Earl Shaffer, 83, American outdoorsman and author.
Sir Clarence Seignoret, 83, president of Dominica (1983–1993).
George Sidney, 85, American film director (Bye Bye Birdie, Viva Las Vegas, Anchors Aweigh).
Odell Stautzenberger, 77, American football player.
Mike Todd, Jr., 72, American film producer, introduced short-lived movie format Smell-O-Vision (Scent of Mystery).
Louis C. Wyman, 85, American politician (U.S. Representative for New Hampshire's 1st congressional district).

6
Murray Adaskin, 96, Canadian violinist, composer, conductor and teacher.
Otis Blackwell, 71, American songwriter, singer and pianist ("Great Balls of Fire", "Don't Be Cruel", "All Shook Up", "Return to Sender").
James Lawton Collins Jr., 84, American military historian, brigadier general in the U.S. Army and viticulturist.
Harry George Drickamer, 83, American chemical engineer, a pioneer in high-pressure studies of condensed matter.
Pim Fortuyn, 54, Dutch politician, assassinated.
Bjørn Johansen, 61, Norwegian jazz musician.

7
Kevyn Aucoin, 40, American make-up artist and author (The Art of Makeup, Making Faces, Face Forward).
Sir Bernard Burrows, 91, British diplomat.
Sir Ewart Jones, 91, Welsh chemist.
Robert Kanigher, 86, American comic book writer and editor (Wonder Woman, The Flash, Sgt. Rock).
Masakatsu Miyamoto, 63, Japanese football player and manager, pneumonia.
Xavier Montsalvatge, 90, Spanish composer and music critic.
Seattle Slew, 28, last living triple crown winner on 25th anniversary of winning Kentucky Derby.

8
Sylvester Barrett, 75, Irish politician (Minister for the Environment, Minister for Defence, Member of the European Parliament).
Basil Chubb, 80, English-Irish political scientist and author (The Government and Politics of Ireland), one of Ireland's leading political academics.
Sir Edward Jackson, 76, English diplomat, (Ambassador to Cuba, Ambassador to Belgium).
Lou Lombardo, 70, American film editor (The Wild Bunch, McCabe & Mrs. Miller, Moonstruck).
Boyce McDaniel, 84, American nuclear physicist, worked on the Manhattan Project, heart attack.

9
St. Clair Balfour, 82, Canadian businessman.
Bernice Layne Brown, 93, American wife of the 32nd Governor of California Edmund "Pat" Brown and the mother of the 34th and 39th Governor of California, Jerry Brown.
Dan Devine, 77, American football player and coach (Arizona State, Missouri, Green Bay Packers, Notre Dame).
Robert Layton, 76, Canadian politician and a member of Parliament (House of Commons representing Lachine and Lachine—Lac-Saint-Louis, Quebec).
James Simpson, 90, British explorer.
Sam Walton, 59, American professional football player (East Texas State, New York Jets, Houston Oilers).

10
Lynda Lyon Block, 54, American convicted murderer, executed by electric chair in Alabama.
George Cates, 90, American music arranger, conductor, songwriter and record producer, known for his work with Lawrence Welk.
John Cunniff, 57, American professional hockey player and coach (Hartford Whalers, Boston Bruins, New Jersey Devils).
Henry W. Hofstetter, 87, American optometrist.
Austen Kark, 75, British television executive, managing director of the BBC World Service.
Leslie Dale Martin, 35, American convicted murderer, executed by lethal injection in Louisiana.
Tom Moore, 88, American athletics promoter.
Yves Robert, 81, French actor, screenwriter, director, and producer.

11
Ramblin' Rod Anders, 68, American television presenter, stroke.
Joseph Bonanno, 97, Sicilian former Mafia boss.
Patrick Fyffe, 60, English female impersonator, known for playing Dame Hilda Bracket of the duo Hinge and Bracket.
Hugo Leistner, 99, American hurdler. 
Sharon Monsky, 48, competitive figure skater as a teenager, Scleroderma.
Bill Peet, 87, American animator and screenwriter (Cinderella, Peter Pan, Alice in Wonderland).
Steve Rachunok, 85, American baseball player (Brooklyn Dodgers).
Nika Turbina, 27, Soviet and Russian poet, fall from window.

12
Richard Chorley, 74, English geographer, heart attack.
Erich Kulas, 22, American professional wrestler known as "Mass Transit", complications from gastric bypass surgery
Wilson Matthews, 80, American football coach.

13
Clinton Adams, 83, American artist, art historian and head of the Tamarind Institute at the University of New Mexico.
Alan P. Bell, 70, American psychologist (Kinsey Institute), known for his study suggesting that homosexuality has a biological basis.
David Chappe, 54, American screenwriter (Gale Force, Beowulf).
Ruth Cracknell, 76, Australian actress (Mother and Son).
Valery Lobanovsky, 63, Ukrainian football coach.
Bill Rodgers, 79, American baseball player (Pittsburgh Pirates).
Morihiro Saito, 74, Japanese aikido teacher.

14
Sir Derek Birley, 75, British educationist, writer and sports historian.
Rawshan Jamil, 71, Bangladeshi actress and dancer.
Gordon J. F. MacDonald, 72, American geophysicist.
Dale Morey, 83, American basketball player.
Sir Laurence Sinclair, 93, Royal Air Force officer during WWII.
Ray Stricklyn, 73, American actor and publicist, emphysema.

15
Bernard Benjamin, 92, British statistician, a leading figure in the field of demography.
Jeannine Guindon, 82, professor of psychology in Quebec, Canada.
Darwood Kaye, 72, American child actor (Our Gang), hit and run accident.
Arthur Peddy, 85, American comic book artist (Justice Society of America).
Bryan Pringle, 67, British actor.
Nellie Shabalala, 49, South African singer and wife of leader/founder of Ladysmith Black Mambazo, Joseph Shabalala.
Esko Tie, 73, Finnish ice hockey player.

16
Alec Campbell, 103, Australia's last surviving ANZAC at the Gallipoli campaign during World War I.
James Dewar, 59, Scottish musician, known as the bassist and vocalist for Robin Trower and Stone the Crows.
Big Dick Dudley, 34, American professional wrestler (ECW), kidney failure.
Kenneth Fung, 90, Hong Kong prominent politician and businessman.
Dorothy Van, 74, American actress.
Sir Gerald Whent, 75, British businessman (Vodafone).

17
Peter Beck, 92, British schoolmaster.
Dave Berg, 81, American cartoonist (Mad, The Lighter Side of...).
Joe Black, 78, American first Black baseball pitcher to win a World Series game (Brooklyn Dodgers, Cincinnati Redlegs, Washington Senators).
Edwin Alonzo Boyd, 88, Canadian bank robber and prison escapee of the 1950s (Citizen Gangster).
James Chichester-Clark, 79, Northern Ireland politician, Prime Minister of Northern Ireland from 1969 to 1971.
John de Lancie, 80, American oboist, principal oboist of the Philadelphia Orchestra and director of the Curtis Institute of Music.
Bobby Robinson, 98, American baseball player.
Little Johnny Taylor, 59, American singer.
Norman Vaughan, 79, English comedian.

18
Charles Brooks, 75, English cricketer.
Song Hye-rim, 65, North Korean actress, best.
Davey Boy Smith, 39, British professional wrestler, myocardial infarction.
Zypora Spaisman, 86, Polish-American actress and Yiddish theatre empresaria.
Gene Arden Vance Jr., 38, American soldier and member of a US Special Forces Airborne Reserve Unit, K.I.A.
Gordon Wharmby, 68, British actor (Last of the Summer Wine), cancer.

19
Sir Ralph Anstruther, 80, British army officer and courtier.
Raymond Durgnat, 69, British film critic (Films and Filming, Film Comment, Monthly Film Bulletin) and author.
Herbert Familton, 74, New Zealand alpine skier (men's downhill, men's giant slalom at the 1952 Winter Olympics).
Sir John Gorton, 90, 19th Prime Minister of Australia.
Earl Hammond, 80, American voice actor (Thundercats).
Walter Lord, 84, American historian.
Otar Lordkipanidze, 72, Georgian archaeologist.

20
David Abrahamsen, 98, Norwegian forensic psychiatrist, psychoanalyst and author (Confessions of Son of Sam, Nixon vs. Nixon: An Emotional Tragedy).
Anastasios Christodoulou, 70, British-Greek university administrator, founding father of The Open University.
Jerry Dunphy, 80, American Los Angeles television news anchor for over four decades.
Stephen Jay Gould, 60, American paleontologist, evolutionary biologist and popular science author, cancer.
Ramzi Irani, 35, Lebanese student activist, murdered.
Conrad L. Raiford, 94, American athlete.
Eberle Schultz, 84, American football player.

21
Rogers Albritton, 78, American philosopher.
Joe Cobb, 86, American child actor, appeared as the original "fat boy" in the Our Gang comedies from 1922 to 1929.
Roy Paul, 82, Welsh footballer.
Bob Poser, 92, American baseball player (Chicago White Sox, St. Louis Browns).
Niki de Saint Phalle, 71, French artist.

22
Fritz Ackley, 65, American baseball player (Chicago White Sox).
Joe Cascarella, 94, American baseball player (Philadelphia Athletics, Boston Red Sox, Washington Senators, Cincinnati Reds).
Faye Dancer, 77, American baseball player (AAGPBL).
Paul Giel, 69, American baseball player (New York/San Francisco Giants, Pittsburgh Pirates, Minnesota Twins) and college football player (Minnesota).
Warren Hacker, 77, American baseball player (Chicago Cubs, Cincinnati Redlegs, Philadelphia Phillies, Chicago White Sox).
Dick Hern, 81, British racehorse trainer.
Chandra Levy, 24, U.S. Congressional intern (body discovered on this date)
Creighton Miller, 79, American football player and attorney.
Patrick Wolrige-Gordon, 66, British (Scottish) politician (Member of Parliament for East Aberdeenshire).

23
Umberto Bindi, 70, Italian singer-songwriter, heart disease.
Albert Carrier, 82, Italian-American film and television actor.
Wally Fromhart, 89, American football player and coach.
Ali Imam, Pakistani painter, heart attack.
Sam Snead, 89, American professional golfer, complications from a stroke.
Dorothy Spencer, 93, American film editor (Stagecoach, Cleopatra, Earthquake).

24
Joseph Bau, 81, Polish-Israeli artist, philosopher, animator, comedian, and poet, pneumonia.
Susie Garrett, 72, American actress (Punky Brewster) and jazz vocalist, cancer.
Toshihito Ito, 40, Japanese actor, Subarachnoid hemorrhage.
Euphemia McNaught, 100, Canadian impressionist painter.
Antonia Pantoja, 79, Puerto Rican educator, feminist, and civil rights leader, cancer.
Xi Zhongxun, 88, Chinese communist revolutionary.

25
Josephine Abady, 52, American theater director who staged plays on and off Broadway.
Pat Coombs, 75, English actress (Till Death Us Do Part, EastEnders, Ooh... You Are Awful).
Zoran Janković, 62, Yugoslavian Olympic water polo player (1964 silver medal, 1968 gold medal, 1972), liver cancer.
Nathan Mantel, 83, American biostatistician, heart attack.
Jack Pollard, 75, Australian sports journalist.
Nancy White, 85, American editor (Harper's Bazaar).

26
Jon Bannenberg, English-Australian yacht designer, brain tumour.
Carmen Beltrán, 97, Mexican American writer, breast cancer.
Lionel Cantú, 36, assistant professor of sociology, Santa Cruz, cardiac arrest.
Orlando Carrió, 46, Argentine-Mexican actor, lung cancer.
Ivo Maček, 88, Croatian pianist, composer and academian.
John Alexander Moore, 86, American biologist.
Neil Naismith, 66, Australian pharmacist.
Vicente Nebrada, 72, Venezuelan dancer and choreographer.
Jean-Jacques Petter, 74, French primatologist.
Mamo Wolde, 69, Ethiopian Olympic long-distance runner (1968 gold medal, 1968 silver medal, 1972 bronze medal), liver cancer.

27
Ray Mathew, 73, Australian author.
Marjorie Ogilvie Anderson, 93, Scottish historian and paleographer.
Shabtai Konorti, 58, Israeli actor, traffic collision.
Santhananda, 81, Hindu spiritual leader and teacher.
Krishna Sen, 45, journalist of Nepal, murdered.
Vitaly Solomin, 60, Soviet and Russian actor, director and screenwriter.

28
Charles J. Adams, 80, brigadier general in the US Air Force.
Napoleon Beazley, 25, American juvenile offender, executed by lethal injection.
Mildred Benson, 96, American journalist and author of children's books (Nancy Drew Mystery Stories).
Jean Berger, 92, German-American composer and conductor.
Ruby Bradley, 94, colonel  in the US Army and of the most decorated women in United States military history.
Alfred Fleishman, 96, American businessman, co-founded Fleishman–Hillard, one of the world's largest public relations firms.
David Parker Ray, 62, suspected American serial killer.
Wes Westrum, 79, American baseball player (New York Giants) and manager (New York Mets, San Francisco Giants), cancer.

29
Stan Bentham, 87, English footballer, Alzheimer's disease.
Charles Ede, 80, English founder of the Folio Society.
Bernice Thurman Hunter, 79, Canadian children's author.
Sam Page, 86, American baseball player (Philadelphia Athletics).
Elémire Zolla, 75, Italian essayist, philosopher and historian.

30
Phyllis Pray Bober, 81, American art historian, scholar, and author.
Kees Boertien, 74, Dutch politician (Christian Democratic Appeal) and jurist.
Kenny Craddock, 52, British instrumentalist (Ringo Starr, Ginger Baker, Gerry Rafferty), composer and producer, car crash.
John B. Keane, 73, Irish playwright, novelist and essayist.
Mário Lago, 90, Brazilian lawyer, poet, composer and actor.
Sándor Mátrai, 69, Hungarian footballer.
Takhir Sabirov, 72, Tajik film director, actor, screenwriter, and art director.

31
Jeremy Bray, 71, British politician (member of Parliament representing Middlesbrough West, Motherwell and Wishaw and Motherwell South).
Subhash Gupte, 72, Indian cricket player.
Eleanor D. Wilson, 93, American actress (Weekend, Alice's Restaurant, Reds) and artist.

References 

2002-05
 05